Leeah Deneen Jackson (born January 26, 1998) is an American teen actress, singer, chef, and dancer with appearances in films and television series and more than 25 commercials.  She played the role of Haley in The Shield TV series. Leeah is presently a student studying "Sports Medicine" and "Film".

Life and career
Jackson was born in St. Louis, Missouri to Towana Taylor-Jackson, and Clarence Jackson Jr. Her grandfather is Clarence Jackson, who is the brother of Henry Jackson Jr. aka Henry Armstrong. The family moved to California to pursue her brother Henry E. Taylor III's career. She is the youngest sibling of 4, LaKia, FaTina, and Henry. A great-niece of professional boxer Henry Jackson Jr. (aka "Henry Armstrong") and fourth cousin of Eleanora Fagan, better known as Billie Holiday. She claims multi-ethnic ancestry, including "African American, "Creole" and "Irish", among others.

Leeah D. Jackson is an actor, dancer, rapper and BMI songwriter. She began her career when she was 3 years old. appearing in television,print advertisements, commercials for companies such as McDonald's, Epson Printer, Kmart, General Motors, HomeTown Buffet and much more.

Her television and film appearances include The Shield, Boston Public, Jimmy Kimmel Live!, ABC Family - HBO Jam, A Mother's Choice, and In The Hive, and music videos for Mindless Behavior's "Girls Talkin' Bout", The Rangers' "Pretty Girl Shake It", Willow Smith's "Whip My Hair", Cori B's "SMH", and Motion City Soundtrack's "Her World Destroys My Planet".

She sang for Michael Jackson at his 45th birthday party. Her latest project was her recorded single, "HeadPhones", which she co-wrote. She is reportedly attending college to pursue a career in Sports Medicine and is working on her cooking show, Cooking 4 Reel

Filmography

Film and television

Discography

 Headphones (2012)   aka Leeah D.
 Flaunt it (2010) 
 My S.W.A.G.G. (2010)

Awards and nominations

References

External links

Leeah's "Cookin 4 reel" website

1998 births
21st-century American singers
21st-century American actresses
Living people
Actresses from St. Louis
Midwest hip hop musicians
Rappers from St. Louis
African-American actresses
African-American female dancers
American female dancers
Dancers from Missouri
American child singers
African-American activists
American child actresses
African-American child actresses
American people of Irish descent
American television actresses
American film actresses
American voice actresses
21st-century African-American women singers
African-American women rappers
21st-century American rappers
21st-century American women singers
21st-century women rappers